George Henri Anne-Marie Victor count de Villebois-Mareuil or by his shortened name George de Villebois-Mareuil (22 March 1847, in Montaigu, Brittany, France – 6 April 1900, in Boshof, Orange Free State, South Africa) was a former colonel in the French infantry who fought and died on the side of the Boers during the Second Anglo-Boer War.
He was the first of only two foreign volunteers to be given the rank of Major-General in the armed forces of the Boer Republics. The other being his second in command Yevgeny Maximov (1849–1904) after the death of Villebois-Mareuil.

Earlier in his career Georges de Villebois-Mareuil took part in the Franco-Prussian War in 1871 and drove the Prussians back from Blois.

Early years

George Henri Anne-Marie Victor count de Villebois-Mareuil was born approximately 30 km South East of Nantes. He was a soldier and author. 
He started his military education at the École Spéciale Militaire de Saint-Cyr where he graduated as a Second Lieutenant in 1867. He loved sport and excelled in gymnastics.
Shortly after his graduation he left for Cochinchina where he joined the Marine Infantry serving under his uncle Admiral René de Cornulier who was Governor of the Colony. He was promoted to full Lieutenant in 1870.

Franco-Prussian War 

Villebois-Mareuil returned to France shortly after the start of the Franco-Prussian War in 1871. He joined the 7th battalion des Chasseurs à Pied, in which he took command of the 6th company.
On 28 January Blois was occupied by the Prussians. Villebois-Mareuil liberated the city and proved himself exemplary under fire, despite being badly injured during the battle. He refused to be evacuated until the end of the hostilities and spent weeks between life and death. He had to spend 9 months in hospital, after which he was decorated and promoted to the rank of Captain.

North Africa 

In 1877 Villebois-Mareuil entered the École Militaire. In 1881, after graduating in 11th place of his class from the prestigious school, he was posted to Algeria.

Villebois-Mareuil served in the Campaign of Tunisia, following which France imposed the status of protectorate on what had previously been a Turkish possession ruled by a regent.

In 1889 Villebois-Mareuil was promoted to the rank of major in the Division of Algiers. In 1892 he received the rank of colonel. At 45 years old he was the youngest colonel in the French Army.

Villebois-Mareuil was appointed to the command of the 130th and then the 67th Régiments d'Infanterie Métropolitain. In 1893 he received the news that his wife had died in her native city of Marseille after an extended and painful illness. In 1896 he described to a friend, "Each time I go to that sad grave in Marseille, I struggle to continue upon life's path, such is my oppressive discouragement"

Foreign Legion 

France invaded Madagascar in 1893. Villebois-Mareuil's request to join the expeditionary forces was refused. To strengthen his chances of being selected for the expeditionary force, Villebois-Mareuil joined the 1st Regiment of the Foreign Legion based in Sidi Bel Abbes in 1895. For six months he commanded the regiment of which two battalions were to join the expeditionary force. Furious at not being selected he left the French Army in 1896.

Between 1896 and 1899 Villebois-Mareuil founded the Union des Sociétés Régimentaires, published military essays and became a militant against the government for the national restoration of France as promoted by Charles Maurras. He was one of the founding members of the Action Française before it included Monarchist ideals in its doctrine.

Second Anglo-Boer War 

Georges de Villebois-Mareuil saw in the Anglo-Boer War the chance to avenge the French humiliation at Fashoda in the Sudan in 1898.

"But she (England) can be sure that this tricolour flag, grabbed from Fachoda and ripped to shreds in London, was brought to Pretoria by French Volunteers, and has taken its place next to those of the Southern Boer Republics to support their independence against the oppressors. She gave us a Hundred Years' War, and for a hundred years she has robbed the farmers from the Cape. Since then she has violated every peace treaty. Her hatred being even fiercer against the Boer, for there is French blood flowing through their veins."

Georges de Villebois-Mareuil arrived in Lourenço Marques on the 22 November 1899. In December 1899 he was appointed to the rank of Major in the Boer forces by General Joubert, and fought in the Battle of Colenso. Due to his leadership capabilities he was given the rank of Major-General and became commander of all Foreign Volunteers on 17 March 1900.

The average age of his troops was thirty with the youngest being Private Boiserolle who was only 17. He had a lot of respect for the fighting ability of the Germans under his command despite the lack of unity between the different German troops and commanders. He did not have the same convictions towards the Dutch under his command due to their apparent lack of courage and eagerness for battle. They were often referred to by Afrikaners themselves as lowly drunkards. He summed his thoughts about the latter as follows: "Noble and of good race for the most, they live on their farm like in the castles of old, free and isolated... These people are standing up in the face of the whole world defying the decline of our too advanced civilizations."

Georges de Villebois-Mareuil was betrayed by his native assistant who fled to inform the British troops of their position. He died leading a small detachment against 750 Yeomanry under Baron Methuen on a hill on the farm of Kareepan near Boshof. At the time of his death he was left with 30 men from an original number of 300 at the beginning of his campaign. Despite being massively outnumbered and enduring 3 hours of Maxim gun fire, Georges de Villebois-Mareuil was quoted as saying that he would never surrender, and would wait for the cover of darkness to escape. During his last minutes he shot two or three British soldiers with his pistol, stood up during the battle to encourage his men, and was shot in the back. He fell near a wild olive tree on the hill that still carries the bullet holes from the battle.

Georges de Villebois-Mareuil's body was taken to Boshof, and given a full military burial by the British, which was paid for by Methuen out of his own pocket. His body was exhumed and reburied in the Heroes Acre in Magersfontein in 1971.

In his memoirs Georges de Villebois-Mareuil recognized the courage and passion of the Boers but reflected on his frustrations with their lack of tactical competence. He regretted the occasions when the Boers could have had major victories, but decided to remain in a defensive position.

He advised General Joubert in this respect, but the Boers decided to not continue with their push to Cape Town.

A song was composed in his honour by Théodore Botrel which read:

De Villebois-Mareuil will be remembered for his impartial analysis of the Boer strategies. One week after his death the Boer Foreign Legion was disbanded and its members placed under General De la Rey to continue with the Guerilla Phase of the War. A mass arranged by the Ligue de la patrie française was held in his honour at the Notre Dame de Paris at which 10,000 people attended.

The general's horse was transported to Britain by Lord Chesham, where it lived until February 1911. Its heart and ceremonial trappings were buried on the village green in Latimer, Buckinghamshire, next to the memorial commemorating those from the locality who had served in South Africa.

Footnotes

References
Bernard Lugan, La Guerre des Boers 1899-1902
F. Chinier, La Presse Français et les Boërs, memoire de maitrise, Université de Lyon III, 1988
La Liberté, 22 February 1900
Les Carnets de Campagne du Colonel de Villebois-Mareuil, 1902

Soldiers of the French Foreign Legion
French memoirists
1847 births
1900 deaths
French military personnel of the Franco-Prussian War
French Army officers
Military personnel killed in the Second Boer War
South African Republic generals
French male non-fiction writers
19th-century memoirists
People affiliated with Action Française